Suning Holdings Group Co., Ltd. is a Chinese privately held company. The company shared the same founder Zhang Jindong with the listed company Suning.com, but Suning Holdings was the unlisted portion of Zhang's unincorporated Suning Group. According to All-China Federation of Industry and Commerce, Suning Holdings Group was ranked as the second largest civilian-run enterprise in the Mainland China in 2018.

The holding company is also famous for the acquisition of Inter Milan.

Suning Holdings, as of 2016, owned an equity stake of 3.33% in Suning.com, formerly known as Suning Commerce Group and Suning Appliance.

Those companies also shared almost the same name with sister company Suning Appliance Group, which Zhang owned 48.10% stake as the second largest shareholder. As at 31 December 2016 Suning Appliance Group was the second largest shareholder of Suning.com, after Zhang. Suning Appliance Group was owned by ex-senior staff of Suning.com (including Zhang himself) as at 2002. Since circa 2015 to 10 April 2017, it was owned by Bu Yang (49.1%), Zhang (48.1%) and Sun Weimin (2.8%), the three senior official of Suning.com.

In 2020 ranked second in the top 500 non-state owned enterprises in China with annual revenues of RMB 665.259 billion and continued to top the list of Internet retailing category.

On February 28, 2021, according to the Reuters Suning.com sold 23% stake to state-owned investors to improve equity structure, long-term strategy due to financial woes.

Operations
In June 2016, Suning Holdings signed a framework agreement with the government of Shandong Province.

Subsidiaries

Suning Rundong
After the deal Suning Rundong owned 33.33% stake in Nubia. Nubia Technology sold mobile phone branded "Nubia". In 2016 Nubia became a sponsor of Jiangsu Suning F.C., a sister company of Suning Rundong for a reported .

As of 2015, Suning Holdings owned 70% stake in Suning Rundong, Suning.com owned 10% and Chen Yan owned 20% stake. The stake that held by Suning Holdings, was increased to 80% in 2016, acquiring an additional 10% from Suning.com.

According to China Daily, Suning Rundong was an investment fund with a size of RMB5 billion.

Suning Culture Investment Management
Suning Culture Investment Management Co., Ltd. was another investment vehicle of the group. As of 2015, it was 90% owned by Suning Holdings Group and 10% owned by Chen Yan.

Suning Culture Investment Management invested  for 10% stake in China International Broadcasting Network (CIBN; incorporated as ), an internet television channel.

PPTV secured the exclusive China TV rights of La Liga for 5 seasons in mid-2015.

Suning Jinkong
Suning Jinkong is an investment vehicle of the group in financial sector.

As of 31 December 2016, it was 80% owned by Suning Holdings and 20% owned by Chen Yan. Moreover, all the paid-in share capital was contributed by Suning Holdings.

That company was a subsidiary of Suning.com. The 35% stake was later transferred to a private equity fund Nanjing Runyu, which Suning.com claimed that, the fund was still controlled by Suning Holdings. According to National Credit Information Publicity System, however, CITIC Trust was a unit holder of the private equity fund; Suning Rundong was the general partner of the fund, which the fund incorporated as a limited partnership.

Suning Sports
Jiangsu Suning Sports, is a joint venture of Suning Holdings and Suning Appliance Group. As of 31 December 2016, Suning Holdings owned 90% stake.

Suning Sports became an angel investor of Champdas (incorporated as ), a company specialize in sports statistics in 2016. Suning Sports also appointed football coach and former player Gong Lei as their sports director.

Jiangsu Suning Sports had a sister company Suning Sports International Limited, a company incorporated in Hong Kong, which was the subsidiary of Suning Culture Investment Management instead, at the date of incorporation on 26 May 2016. However, it was known that Jiangsu Suning Sports had acquired Suning Sports International on 30 May 2016.

On February 28, 2021, Suning Group immediately halt operations at their Chinese football clubs - including champions Jiangsu FC - due to financial woes.

Inter Milan
On 6 June 2016 Suning Holdings, via Great Horizon S.à r.l., signed a contract to acquire a majority stake (about 70% shares) in Inter Milan by the subscription of a capital increase and from the consortium of Erick Thohir (International Sports Capital) and the consortium of Massimo Moratti (Internazionale Holding). The deal was approved by the extraordinary general meeting on 28 June, which after the deal, Suning Holdings owned 68.55% shares.

According to website Calcio e Finanza (which purchased filings in Hong Kong Companies Registry and Luxembourg Business Registers) and Il Sole 24 Ore columnist Carlo Festa, Great Horizon direct parent company was Suning Sports International Limited, in turn a subsidiary of Suning Culture International Limited (as of the date of incorporation of Suning Sports International on 26 May 2016), in turn a subsidiary of Suning Culture Investment Management.

According Suning Sports International's 2017 Annual Return submission to the Hong Kong Companies Registry, Jiangsu Suning Sports had acquired the entire share capital of Suning Sports International from sister company Suning Culture International on 30 May 2016, few weeks before the takeover of Inter Milan. However, Chen Yan remained as the sole director of Suning Sports International.

In February 2021, according to the Financial Times Inter Milan is working with Goldman Sachs and rushing to raise at least $200m in emergency cash or sale the club, after the Italian football club's finances deteriorated due to the pandemic and heavy spending on top players.

On May 2, 2021, four days before the end of the Serie A championship, he won the nineteenth championship in the history of the club, 11 years after the triumph of the season 009-2010. The Suning group, in the fifth year of management of the company, after the second place in domestic league of the season 2019-2020 and the defeat in the final of UEFA Europa League, is the first foreign property to win the Scudetto in Italy and the first Chinese to win in Europe. In mid-May 2021, Inter signed a 275 million euro ($336 million) deal with US based Oaktree Capital Management in the hope the deal will help the team's troubled finances that were damaged by the COVID-19 pandemic. The fund granted the loan to Great Horizon Sarl – the Luxembourg-based holdings company via which Suning controls Inter.

In the first five years of Suning management, the company value touches + 120% (second best performance in Europe), more than 500 million euros are spent on the market, 500 million fans are reached in worldwide and the highest growth in all of Europe of followers on social media (+ 232%) and new infrastructures are also created such as the club house in the sports center, the Inter media house, the center for the youth sector and the new headquarters in Viale della Liberazione, Milan.

Charity 
Suning's public welfare philosophy is "Rooting Society and Growing Business". The Suning Social Worker Voluntary Action "1 + 1 Sunshine Walk" invites Suning employees to take voluntary social responsibility. At least one day per year is used for social volunteer work and at least one salary day is donated each year for public assistance donations. In addition to donating to charity, Suning also initiated the "Suning Nesting Action" to build school buildings in poor areas; the "Suning Xiqiao Project" to help repair repairs in remote areas to solve travel difficulties and finance the "Suning Sunny Dream" rural education. Additionally, Suning Appliance annually sponsors tree planting activities in various regions of China.

On December 26, 2013, following the tradition of celebrating public welfare, Suning made charitable donations, including the donation of 36,95 millions yuan. In August 2016, Suning, which recently became the majority shareholder of Inter, donated € 200,000 to help the people affected by the earthquake in Central Italy.

In January 2020, with the spread of COVID-19 pandemic, Suning Holdings Group mobilized through the divisions of "Suning International" and "Suning Logistics", supported relief efforts from the start of the emergency, with free shipping services and product donations imported from abroad to local hospitals and institutions. President Zhang Kangyang, the Inter club and Suning have donated 300,000 Personal protective equipment and Surgical mask to Wuhan and to the Hubei hospital, to support the fight against the COVID-19 pandemic.

On February 25, 2021, Suning Group received the "China Charity Awards" for the sixth time, the highest recognition in this field, for continuing its efforts in the fight against poverty. Suning has donated more than RMB 2,3 billions for targeted poverty reduction and rural revitalization, with RMB 850 millions earmarked for special initiatives. Suning has donated funds and equipment to 388 impoverished counties in over 20 provinces, including Yunnan, Sichuan, Guizhou, Xinjiang and Shaanxi. The company has built 170 Suning bridges, 160 Suning Dream Center, 74 Suning school buildings, helping to solve the issues of basic education and housing for more than 100,000 school-age  children in the country's rural areas, 20 roads and countless other public interest projects. In addition, its football charity program covers over 300 schools, while the Dream Caravan-Suning project to bring education to students across the country has already reached 60 schools, starting dozens of educational courses. It has opened over 7,000 E-commerce stores and created channels to help farmers sell their products on digital pavilions. Total sales exceeded RMB 14 billions, destined for over 10,000 poverty-stricken villages and helping over 500,000 families. The company also launched 116 poverty reduction training centers in 111 hard-hit counties, employing more than 6,000 people.

Financial data

Sister companies
 Suning Real Estate, Zhang owned 65% stake
 Suning Appliance Group, Zhang owned 48.1% stake as the second largest shareholder
 Suning.com, Zhang owned 17.62% stake directly

See also 
List of largest private non-governmental companies by revenue

References

External links
   

Holding companies of China
Conglomerate companies of China
Privately held companies of China
Companies based in Nanjing